Ivano-Frankivsk Oblast local election, 2015 was a local election in Ivano-Frankivsk Oblast.

Results

Ivano-Frankivsk city council

References

External links 
 Official website Ivano-Frankivsk Oblast Council
 The 2015 elections to the Ivano-Frankivsk Oblast council. Central Election Commission of Ukraine.

Local elections in Ukraine
2015 elections in Ukraine
Ivano-Frankivsk Oblast
October 2015 events in Ukraine